The 2007 Duramed Futures Tour was a series of professional women's golf tournaments held from March through September 2007 in the United States. The Futures Tour is the second-tier women's professional golf tour in the United States and is the "official developmental tour" of the LPGA Tour.  

On July 18, 2007, the LPGA announced that it had acquired the Futures Tour effective immediately, "bringing women's professional golf now under one umbrella."  Previously the Futures Tour had operated as a licensee of the LPGA.

Schedule and results
The number in parentheses after winners' names shows the player's total number of official money, individual event wins on the Futures Tour including that event.

Tournaments in bold are majors.

2007 Leading money winners
These top five money winners at the end of the 2007 season were awarded fully exempt status on the LPGA Tour for the 2008 season.

See also
2007 in golf

References

External links
Official site

Symetra Tour
Futures